Charles F. Grainger (January 23, 1854 – April 13, 1923) was Mayor of Louisville, Kentucky from 1901 to 1905. He became president of Grainger & Company, his family's iron foundry.

Life
He was elected to the Board of Aldermen representing the Seventh Ward in 1890. He became board president in 1893, and was quite powerful in the Democratic Party, temporarily eclipsing long-time party boss John Whallen. Grainger was elected mayor in 1901.

During his term as mayor, the Jefferson County Armory (which became Louisville Gardens) was built, as was a new jail building and the main branch of the Louisville Free Public Library. After his term as mayor he became president of the Louisville Water Company.

He was president of the Louisville Jockey Club from 1902 to 1918. As President, he purchased Churchill Downs in 1905. He served as manager of the famous facility from 1918 until his death. He is credited with helping build the prominence of the Kentucky Derby, increasing the purse from five to fifty thousand dollars during his term. He also introduced the first parimutuel betting system in the United States.

He died in 1923 of heart disease and was buried in Cave Hill Cemetery.

References

External links

1854 births
1923 deaths
Mayors of Louisville, Kentucky
Burials at Cave Hill Cemetery